"Come Back Again" is an Australian rock song, released by Daddy Cool in September 1971 on the Sparmac record label. It reached number 3 in the Australian charts.

Composition and recording
Author Wilson said the song, "was based on a Sleepy John Estes feel. A A A then kick to D G D and "Zoop Bop". I virtually wrote in my head in Darwin." He later declared it his favourite Daddy Cool song. "I love "Come Back Again" because it's so simple. It's just eight bars repeated."

Hannaford noted, "When Ross wrote those songs they were very complete and they were based on a riff. I’m almost playing the same part in "Eagle Rock" and "Come Back Again".

Drummer Gary Young said, "The main feel, the thing that made Daddy Cool sound like Daddy Cool was the shuffle beat. The shuffle is almost identical to what was called swing in the 1930s. If you slow down a jazz swing shuffle, using the cymbal and the snare, you get the beat and rhythm for "Come Back Again".

The single version was a minute shorter than the album recording. Wilson said, "The engineer was John Golden who, together with Robie Porter, did a fabulous job, I think the sound on our first album was really great and the editing on tracks like "Come Back Again" was inspired. We recorded the song as we played it, a live, long extrapolated version that was eventually edited to fit the single and album format, I learnt a lot from that process."

Reception
Dave Laing at Please Kill Me said, "The second Australian smash hit from the album was the moseying "Come Back Again", a sort of country lope filtered through an R&B groove. The Sydney Morning Herald described it as a "hugely successful single [that] featured Hannaford's twangy guitar solos and the contrasting voices of Wilson (falsetto) and Hannaford (bass)."

The Age said the song was, "entrenched in the Australian consciousness".

Reviewed at the time of release, Go-Set said the song was, "the best track on the album. This is where they really ham up the sentimentality and make the most of Ross Hannaford's incredible bass voice. It's the essence of what Daddy Cool are doing."

Personnel
 Wayne Duncan – bass guitar, backing vocals
 Ross Hannaford – lead guitar, backing vocals
 Ross Wilson – lead vocals, guitar, harmonica
 Gary Young – drums, backing vocals

Additional credits
 Robie Porter – producer

References

1971 songs
Daddy Cool (band) songs
Songs written by Ross Wilson (musician)
Wizard Records singles